The Dialog K45 is a dual-SIM slate format smartphone designed and developed in China by Innos and marketed in Sri Lanka by Dialog Axiata that runs the Android operating system. It has a 1.2 GHz ARM Cortex-A5 CPU with 768 MB LPDDR1 SD-RAM.  The handset has a 540x960 pixels 4.5-inch IPS QHD Capacitive display.  It has 4 GB of internal storage.  Compatible networks for this device are GPRS, EDGE and 3G. It has Wi-Fi, Bluetooth and USB connectivity. The device was launched with Android 4.0.4 Ice Cream Sandwich.

References

External links
 Dialog K45
 Dialog K45 – Android Smart Phone (innOS i6)

Android (operating system) devices